Bastora is a village in North Goa, India. It is located on the outskirts of Mapusa town. Green and still scenic, this is one of the many communities and villages that makes up mainly-rural, but fast-urbanising Goa.

Name and origins

Bastora was earlier known as Bastodem, when it is believed to have been by the Kadamba and Vijaynagara dynasties that ruled the region. Like the rest of the region of Bardez came under Portuguese rule some 33 years after Lisbon conquered the region now known as Old Goa in 1510.

Local landmarks

Bastora was earlier home to St Xavier's College, which later shifted to Mapusa. It is also home to the Holy Cross School, and a prominent publishing and printing institution that played a key role in Goa's intellectual life for decades, Tipografia Rangel. It is now home to Asha Bawan a drug rehabilitation's home at Boa Vista. The SFS Institute bastora run by the Missionaries of St Francis de Sales is one of the older and prominent landmarks in the village. Previously home to St. Xavier's College, this institute now functions as a seminary and is particularly famous for its basketball court.

St Xavier's College

St Xavier's College was founded in 1963 in Bastora, and initially run by the Jesuits, who deputed former St Xavier's College, Bombay principal Fr Edward D'Cruz to take over as principal. Fr. Nicolau Pereira, who had a doctorate from the United States, oversaw the shifting of the college to Mapusa in 1968.

According to Dr Jaime Rangel, there earlier was a proposal to locate the college complex in Bastora itself, on land to be acquired from the local Comunidade of Bastora. But, writes Rangel, due to some disagreements with some comunidade functionaries, land was instead acquired from the Mapusa Comunidade.

Tipografia Rangel

Launched in 1886, this printing press and publishing house—whose imprint marks many books published in Goa during the period—continued in operation till 1994. It was founded by Janin Rangel. Its books are still visible in libraries across the world.

Janin Rangel published his first book on Konkani Grammar, and also compiled the Solfeggio, 1o, 2o and 3o Tomo, which continued being used by music students in Goa for long. The Boletim do Instituto Vasco da Gama later renamed to Boletim do Instituto Menezes Bragança was published from here. An annual almanac was also a feature of Tipografia Rangel.

Holy Cross High School

Another village institution is the Holy Cross High School, run by the Sisters of the Cross of Chavanod. It was founded in 1936. Among those credited with building this institution are, the French nun Mother Margaret and Sister Beatrice, a Goan nun from the village of Siolim, who was later knows as Mother Beatrice. Over the years, literally thousands of students have passed from this school.

Bastora parish

Bastora parish is part of the Mapusa Deanery, which also comprises the villages of Colvale, Cunchelim, Mapusa, Pirna, Revora, Socorro, Ucassaim, Parra and Porvorim.

This parish church with Saint Cajetan as patron, was dedicated to Our Lady of Hope (Nossa Senhora de Esperanca], initially erected as a chapel in 1752, and affiliated to the church at Ucassaim  Uccassaim's church was completed in 1628 to cover Ucassaim, Bastora, Punola and Paliem.

Bastora's chapel was consecrated a church on 1 May 1947.

This church, built in stone masonry, is in the Mannerist Neo-Roman style, which originated in Italy in the fifteenth century, with the vision of reviving the style of old Imperial Rome.

Mannerism is an ambiguous mode of Neo-Roman style, in which architects began to express their individual style or "manner" not always sin conformity to standard rules. Mannerism flourished among Goan churches from 1550-1760.

This church's frontal façade has a miniature template with a niche that holds the statue of St Cajetan. Twin bell-towers with the finial in the shape of an obelisk or spear-head also mark its architecture.

Recently, the church was renovated, while maintaining its architectural features.

Some of the parish priests of St Cajetan Church at Bastora as follows:
 Fr Vincente Correia (1947–48)
 Fr Bernardo Menezes (from Goa Velha, 1948–65)
 Fr Benedito Dias e Souza (from Nagoa-Bardez, 1965–68)
 Fr Jose Paulo Nazare (from Moira, 1968–81)
 Fr (Dr) Lino MOnteiro (from Loutolim, 1981–89)
 Fr Antonio Xavier D'Souza (from Corjuem, Aldona, 1989–92)
 Fr Wenceslaus Mascarenhas (from Loutolim, 1992–2002)
 Fr Angelo Bonamis (from Margao, 2002 - 2009)
 Fr Herculano Nicolau da Costa Correia 2009- ?
 Fr John Fernandes ? - Till date (06-04-2013)

Amenities

Other recognisable points or institutions in the village are Cafe Prakash at the Boa Vista locality of Bastora, the Friends XI Sports Club of Vaddem, William D'Souza General Stores of Balbot, Cafe Tato and Satpurush General Stores at Boa Vista,  Kuku Farm at Pello Vaddo in nearby Uccasiam, Mr Fixit of Boa Vista, the Bastora Ucassaim Group MP Co-operative Society Ltd, Lobo printers, Xell, Alcrafts workshop (for aluminium windows and doors) at Teliavaddo, among others.

Bastora Union is a network of villagers based in the Indian commercial capital of Mumbai (formerly Bombay). The Comunidade of Bastora is a community-based land-owning traditional institution. Women and Child Welfare Association of Bastora currently (May 2006) has Alima Monteiro and Reema Morosker as its general secretaries.

Prominent villagers
 Anil Vinayak Lad, Editor Proprietor of In Goa 24x7 Channel In Goa News website
 Msgr Estevam Jeremias Mascarenhas, member of Parliament of Portugal
 Fr joseph Albuquerque, Superior General of Pilar Fathers
 Justice Antonio Abreu Lobo, Judge of the Supreme Court of Lisbon
 Dr Ubaldo Mascarenhas, physician-mayor of Bombay
 Dr Jaime Valfredo Rangel, physician and president of the Municipal Council of Bardez, also delegate to the International Labour Organisation.
 Joao Abreu Lobo, Administrator of Salcete
 Caetano Castelino, secretary-general of the Municipal Council of Bardez or the Camara de Bardez
 Vincente João Janin Rangel, founder of Tipografia Rangel and editor of O Indispensavel Musicologist
 Dr Jeremias Mascarenhas, physician and health officer of Mormugao
 Dr Felipe Mascarenhas, physician
 Dr John Menezes, physician
 Dr João Damasceno Constancio Filipe De Sousa (Damaciano Souza), superintendent and medical officer at the central prison, Belgaum, superintendent and medical officer Etra-mural Hyderabad (Sind), Superintendent and District Officer, District Jail, Karachi awarded the King George V Silver Jubilee Medal (1935) and King George VI Coronation Medal (1937)
 Dr Jose Rangel, physician and director of the Voicuntrao Dempo Centre for Indo-Portuguese Studies, writer and poet.
 Ervelle Menezes, Media

References

Villages in North Goa district